360 Safeguard and 360 Total Security is a program developed by Qihoo 360, an internet security company based in China. 360 Safeguard's focus is on stopping malware such as computer viruses and trojan horses and providing security patches for Microsoft Windows. 360 Safeguard trojan horse scanner is cloud-based. A heuristics engine is built into the scanner.

360 Safeguard uses Avira engine in addition to own engines, while 360 Total Security has the Kunpeng engine, made by Qihoo.

Dispute with Tencent 

In 2010, 360 Safeguard analyzed the QQ protocol and accused QQ of automatically scanning users' computers and of uploading their personal information to QQ's servers without users' consent. In response, Tencent called 360 itself malware and denied users with 360 installed access to some QQ services. The Chinese Ministry of Industry and Information reprimanded both companies for "improper competition" and ordered them to come to an accord.

Dispute with testing bodies 
On 30 April 2015, the three independent security testing bodies AV-Comparatives, AV-TEST and Virus Bulletin published a joint press release criticizing Qihoo 360 after they found that Qihoo 360 had submitted products for comparative which behaved significantly different from end user products. The products for comparative used an engine by Bitdefender, while the end user products use Qihoo 360's own QVM engine instead. The testing bodies claimed that the end user products would provide a considerably lower level of protection and a higher likelihood of false positives. As a consequence, the three testing bodies revoked all certifications and rankings from earlier that year.

Qihoo 360 denied cheating allegations claiming that the QVM engine developed by Qihoo 360 would be more effective in China.

See also 
 360 Secure Browser
 Comparison of antivirus software
 Internet security
 List of antivirus software

References

External links 
 360 Total Security (global version) official website 
 360 Safeguard (360安全卫士) official website 

Computer security software
IOS software
Antivirus software